A  means "governmental district" and is a type of administrative division in Germany. Four of sixteen  (states of Germany) are split into . Beneath these are rural and urban districts.

Saxony has  (directorate districts) with more responsibilities shifted from the state parliament.

The cities of Bremen, Hamburg and Berlin – the city states – have a different system.

 serve as regional mid-level local government units in four of Germany's sixteen federal states: Baden-Württemberg, Bavaria, Hesse and North Rhine-Westphalia.

Translations
 is a German term variously translated into English as "governmental district", "administrative district" or "province", with the first two being the closest literal translations.

History
The first  were established in the Kingdom of Bavaria and the Kingdom of Prussia in 1808. During the course of the Prussian reforms between 1808 and 1816, Prussia subdivided its provinces into 25 , eventually featuring 37 such districts within 12 provinces. By 1871, at the time of German unification, the concept of  had been adopted by most States of the German Empire. Similar entities were initially established in other states under different names, including   (district captainship) in Saxony,  (district) in Bavaria and Württemberg (not to be confused with the present-day  or  districts), and province in Hesse.

The  in the state of North Rhine-Westphalia in modern Germany are in direct continuation of those created in the Prussian Rhine and Westphalia provinces in 1816. Regierungsbezirke never existed in Bremen, Hamburg, Schleswig-Holstein, and Saarland.

In 1946, Lower Saxony was founded by the merger of the three former Free States of Brunswick, Oldenburg, Schaumburg-Lippe, and the former Prussian province of Hanover. Brunswick and Oldenburg became  (roughly administrative regions of extended competence) alongside six less autonomous Prussian-style  comprising the Province of Hanover and Schaumburg-Lippe. These differences in autonomy and size were levelled on 1 January 1978, when four  replaced the two  and the six : Brunswick and Oldenburg, Aurich, Hanover (remaining mostly the same), Hildesheim, Lüneburg, Osnabrück and Stade.

Following the reunification of Germany in 1990, the territory of the former East Germany was organized into six re-established new federal states, including a reunified Berlin. Saxony and Saxony-Anhalt established three  each, while the other new states didn't implement them.

2000s disbandment and reorganization
On 1 January 2000, Rhineland-Palatinate disbanded its three  of Koblenz, Rheinhessen-Pfalz and Trier.

On 1 January 2004, Saxony-Anhalt disbanded its three  of Dessau, Halle and Magdeburg. On 1 January 2005, Lower Saxony followed suit, disbanding its remaining four  of Brunswick, Hanover, Lüneburg, and Weser-Ems.

The  were still named Chemnitz, Dresden, and Leipzig, but a border change was necessary because the new district of Mittelsachsen crossed the borders of the old .

Regierungsbezirke by state 
Currently, only four German states out of 16 in total are divided into ; all others are directly divided into districts without mid-level agencies. Those four states are divided into a total of 19 , ranging in population from 5,255,000 (Düsseldorf) to 1,065,000 (Gießen):

 Baden-Württemberg: Freiburg, Karlsruhe, Stuttgart, Tübingen
 Bavaria: Upper Bavaria, Lower Bavaria, Upper Palatinate, Upper Franconia, Middle Franconia, Lower Franconia, Swabia
 Hesse: Darmstadt, Gießen, Kassel
 North Rhine-Westphalia: Arnsberg, Cologne, Detmold, Düsseldorf, Münster

List of historic former Regierungsbezirke
 Prussia
 Berlin, comprising the city and several suburbs, incorporated into Regierungsbezirk Potsdam of Brandenburg in 1822
 Kleve, Province of Jülich-Cleves-Berg, incorporated into Düsseldorf region in 1822
 Reichenbach, Province of Silesia, incorporated into Breslau and Liegnitz regions in 1820
 Stralsund, Province of Pomerania, incorporated into Stettin Region in 1932
 Dissolved in 1919/20 after cession of territory according to the Treaty of Versailles:
 Bromberg, Province of Posen
 Danzig, Province of West Prussia (see Free City of Danzig)
 Lorraine, Imperial Land of Alsace-Lorraine 
 Lower Alsace, Imperial Land of Alsace-Lorraine 
 Marienwerder, Province of West Prussia, re-established as West Prussia region of the East Prussia province in 1922
 Posen, Province of Posen
 Upper Alsace, Imperial Land of Alsace-Lorraine 
 Established after the 1939 Invasion of Poland, dissolved in 1945:
 Hohensalza, Reichsgau Wartheland
 Kattowitz, Province of Silesia (Upper Silesia from 1941)
 Litzmannstadt (Kalisch until 1941), Reichsgau Wartheland
 Posen, Reichsgau Wartheland
 Zichenau, Province of East Prussia
 Former eastern territories, dissolved in 1945:
 Allenstein, Province of East Prussia
 Breslau, Province of Silesia
 Frankfurt, Province of Brandenburg
 Gumbinnen, Province of East Prussia
 Köslin, Province of Pomerania
 Königsberg, Province of East Prussia
 Liegnitz, Province of Silesia
 Oppeln, Province of Silesia
 Posen-West Prussia (Schneidemühl), Province of Pomerania, established in 1938
 Stettin, Province of Pomerania
 Allied-occupied Germany:
 Erfurt, dissolved in 1944/1945
 Frankfurt, dissolved in 1945, Province of Brandenburg
 Liegnitz, Province of Silesia, dissolved in 1945
 Magdeburg, dissolved in 1945, reestablished in 1990 and redissolved in 2004
 Merseburg, dissolved in 1944/1945
 Minden, Province of Westphalia, incorporated into Detmold in 1947
 Potsdam, dissolved in 1945, Province of Brandenburg
 Schleswig, dissolved in 1946, Province of Schleswig-Holstein
 Sigmaringen, Province of Hohenzollern, incorporated into Württemberg-Hohenzollern in 1946.
 Stettin, dissolved in 1945, Province of Pomerania

References

External links

 
Regierungsbezirke